The 1992–93 SM-liiga season was the 18th season of the SM-liiga, the top level of ice hockey in Finland. 12 teams participated in the league, and TPS Turku won the championship.

Standings

Playoffs

Quarterfinals
 TPS - Ilves 3:1 (6:0, 5:4 P, 1:3, 4:3)
 Jokerit - Ässät 0:3 (6:7, 2:3, 3:4 P)
  HIFK - JYP 1:3 (2:4, 2:5, 4:1, 1:4)
 HPK - Lukko 3:0 (2:0, 4:3, 3:1)

Semifinals
 TPS - Ässät 3:1 (6:3, 1:4, 6:3, 6:0)
 HPK - JYP 3:2 (6:3, 0:1, 4:1, 1:2, 2:1)

3rd place
 JYP - Ässät 4:3

Final
 TPS - HPK 3:1 (9:3, 5:6, 3:2, 3:1)

Relegation

External links
 SM-liiga official website

1992–93 in Finnish ice hockey
Fin
Liiga seasons